Mesenochroa is a genus of moths in the subfamily Arctiinae described by Felder in 1874.

Species
 Mesenochroa guatemalteca Felder, 1874
 Mesenochroa rogersi Druce, 1885

References

External links

Arctiinae